Alfredo Sánchez Monteseirín (born 25 September 1957) is a Spanish politician from the Spanish Socialist Workers' Party (PSOE) who was Mayor of Seville between 1999 and 2011.

References

1957 births
Living people
Mayors of Seville
Spanish Socialist Workers' Party politicians
People from La Rinconada
University of Seville alumni
Seville city councillors